The 27th annual Four Hills Tournament was won by Finnish athlete Pentti Kokkonen after two Third place finishes and two victories. No competitor had the necessary constancy over the course of the tournament. Yury Ivanov, the winner of Oberstdorf, only placed 56th (85.2 pts) in Garmisch-Partenkirchen. Josef Samek's Garmisch victory was followed by a 38th place (169.1 pts) in Innsbruck.

Participating nations and athletes

Spain was represented at the Four Hills Tournament for the first time.

Results

Oberstdorf
 Schattenbergschanze, Oberstdorf
30 December 1978

Garmisch-Partenkirchen
 Große Olympiaschanze, Garmisch-Partenkirchen
2 January 1979

Innsbruck
 Bergiselschanze, Innsbruck
4 January 1979

Bischofshofen
 Paul-Ausserleitner-Schanze, Bischofshofen
6 January 1979

Final ranking

References

External links
 FIS website
 Four Hills Tournament web site

Four Hills Tournament
1978 in ski jumping
1979 in ski jumping